The Indonesia Morowali Industrial Park (IMIP) is an industrial park hosting nickel-related industries in Morowali Regency, Central Sulawesi, Indonesia. It is the largest nickel processing site in Indonesia, which is the world's top nickel producer. In 2023, Wired magazine called it "the world's epicenter for nickel production." The park is a joint venture between Indonesian mining company Bintang Delapan Group and the Chinese firm Tsingshan Holding Group.

IMIP's activities have seriously polluted the local environment and disrupted nearby communities. Workers and advocacy organizations report poor working conditions, with a number of deaths and injuries from industrial accidents. The park employs about 81,000 people.

Background 

Indonesia has the world's largest nickel reserves. Nickel is used to manufacture lithium-ion batteries used in electric vehicles, and Indonesia is positioned to be a key supplier of the mineral for the booming electric vehicle battery market. The country banned export of unprocessed nickel ores around 2013, and has signed several deals with battery manufacturers.

In 2022, Indonesia produced 1.6 million tons of nickel. This was nearly half of world production. Also in 2022, the administration of president Joko Widodo relaxed environmental and worker safety regulations to attract foreign investment.

Description 
The industrial park is located in Bahodopi district of Morowali Regency, Central Sulawesi. It covers 3,000 hectares, and is served by a seaport, an airport, and a 2 GW coal power plant. It is operated by PT Indonesia Morowali Industrial Park.

There were reportedly 18 companies operating at IMIP with a total investment of USD 15.3 billion in October 2022, with the park's management predicting 40 companies by 2025. The park's estimated total capacity for stainless steel production was 3 million metric tonnes per year in 2020. In 2019, IMIP had plans to develop electric vehicle battery plants. It generated USD 6.6 billion in exports for Indonesia in 2019.

History
Morowali had been the site of a nickel mining operation by Vale's subsidiary Inco since 1968. In August 2013, the Indonesian Ministry of Industry announced plans to develop a 1,500 hectare nickel-oriented industrial park in Morowali. A MoU for the USD 1.5 billion project was signed between Tsingshan Holding Group and Bintang Delapan Group in October 2013, and the first stone for the industrial park's construction was placed by Minister of Industry Saleh Husin on 5 December 2014. Companies began to operate starting in April 2015, with president Joko Widodo inaugurating a smelter on 28 May 2015.

In 2018, it was estimated that IMIP produced 50% of Indonesia's nickel products.

Impact
Environmentalists report that pollution from IMIP has destroyed fish populations and local forests. Local residents also experience frequent disruptions in power, phone, and internet services due to oversaturation. The population has grown very quickly due to the workers, sanitation services have not been provided, and there are open sewers.

Workforce 
There were around 28,500 employees working at IMIP in August 2018, of which around 3,100 were foreign workers, and an additional 50,000 indirect jobs were estimated to be related to the industrial park. In February 2023, approximately 81,000 people worked there, including around 10,700 foreign workers, mostly from China. Many workers report working 15-hour days for $25/day with no days off. Indonesian workers have also complained about how foreign (i.e. Chinese) workers receive higher pay, and communication problems have caused further frustrations. 

Workers and advocacy organisations report unsafe working conditions in some smelters at IMIP. Deaths and injuries are frequently reported, and pollution has caused respiratory illness and eye problems. Hundreds of workers rallied at a smelter owned by PT Gunbuster Nickel in January 2023, demanding better safety measures and more pay. One report found that ten people had died at the smelter between 2020 and 2023. Two workers were killed on the fourth day of the strike. A government official said they had little power to enforce safety regulations in the industry. 

In 2023, some workers filed a lawsuit against the company over poor working conditions.

References

Central Sulawesi
Industrial parks in Indonesia
Nickel mines in Indonesia